, also titled City of Violence and Street of Violence (The Pen Never Lies), is a 1950 Japanese crime and drama film directed by Satsuo Yamamoto. Its story is based on a reportage published in the newspaper The Asahi Shimbun.

Plot
In the city of Tōjō, news reporter Kita is first insulted by local boss Onishi and later threatened by gangsters after an article on corrupt businessmen, officials and authorities. Bureau chief Sagawa withdraws Kita for his and his family's protection and instead sends a group of colleagues to Tōjō to investigate. Aided by a group of organised young people and formerly intimidated citizens, who are weary of the ongoing corruption and violence, the reporters can finally expose the schemings. In the closing voice-over, the narrator cautions the audience to stay attentive to prevent a return of the depicted violence.

Cast
 Ryō Ikebe as Kawasaki
 Akitake Kōno as Enomoto
 Masao Mishima as Onishi
 Hajime Izu
 Miki Sanjō as Tazuko, Kita's sister
 Yasumi Hara as Kita
 Hatae Kishi as Harue
 Masao Shimizu as Okano
 Eitarō Ozawa
 Takashi Shimura as Sagawa
 Jūkichi Uno as Natsume
 Taiji Tonoyama
 Osamu Takizawa as Prosecutor Togami

Background
Street of Violence was produced by a production committee established especially for this film, which included the Japan Film Workers Union. Among the cast were actors under contract with the studios Toho, Shōchiku and Daiei, and independent film and theatre actors. It was shot on location where the actual events, which became known as the "Tōjō incident", had taken place.

Notes

References

External links
 

1950 films
1950 crime films
1950 drama films
Japanese drama films
Japanese crime films
Japanese black-and-white films
Films directed by Satsuo Yamamoto
Films scored by Ichirō Saitō
1950s Japanese films